Poço Verde is the westernmost municipality in the Brazilian state of Sergipe. Its population was 23,867  and its area is 431 square kilometers (166.4 square miles).

References

Populated places established in 1953
Municipalities in Sergipe